Theresa Michalak (born 7 May 1992) is a German competitive swimmer and former European champion.  She represented Germany at the 2012 Summer Olympics in London, competing in the 200-metre individual medley and 4×200-metre freestyle relay.  Michalak holds the German records for the 100-metre and 200-metre individual medley.  She won the gold medal in the 100-metre individual medley at the 2011 European Short Course Swimming Championships.

Michalak accepted an athletic scholarship to attend the University of Florida in Gainesville, Florida, in the United States, where she trained with 2012 U.S. Olympic coach Gregg Troy's Florida Gators swimming and diving team.

Private life 
In January 2015, Michalak came out as a lesbian sportswoman.

See also 

 List of University of Florida Olympians

References

External links 

  Theresa Michalak – Olympic athlete profile at Sports-Reference.com

1992 births
Living people
Florida Gators women's swimmers
German female swimmers
Olympic swimmers of Germany
Swimmers at the 2012 Summer Olympics
LGBT swimmers
German LGBT sportspeople
Lesbian sportswomen